Prison hulks were decommissioned ships that authorities used as floating prisons in the 18th and 19th centuries. They were extensively used in England. The term "prison hulk" is not synonymous with the related term convict ship. A hulk is a ship that is afloat, but incapable of going to sea, whereas convict ships are seaworthy vessels that transport convicted felons from their place of conviction to their place of banishment.

Initial authorization and later expansion of use
Parliament initially intended to use the hulks as a temporary measure and so the first authorization, in 1776, for their use was only for two years. Although some Members of Parliament deplored the hulks the 1776 Act lasted for 80 years. Parliament regularly renewed the Act and even extended its scope "for the more severe and effectual punishment of atrocious and daring offenders". The American Revolutionary War, the French Revolutionary Wars, and the Napoleonic Wars resulted in the availability of superannuated vessels suitable for conversion to prison hulks. Ships-of-the-line were particularly suitable because of their size; in active service they had accommodation for hundreds of crewmen.

Hulks ceased to be used in Great Britain on the final expiry of the Act in 1857.

Conversion of decommissioned ships
Converting the ships to prison hulks involved removal of the rigging, masts, rudders, and various other features required for sailing. Some hulks retained some of these features, but all were rendered inoperable or unseaworthy in some way. The internal structure was also reconfigured with various features, including cells, in order to accommodate convicted criminals or occasionally prisoners of war.

The hulks, which retained only their ability to float, were typically located in harbours. This made them convenient temporary holding quarters for convicts awaiting transportation to Australia and other penal colonies within the British Empire. In 1798 the hulks held more than 1,400 out of about 1,900 people waiting for transportation to Australia. Most British prison hulks were decommissioned in the 19th century, although suspected and convicted criminals are still confined aboard ships on occasion for various reasons.

See also
 List of ships of the line of the Royal Navy
 Convict ship
 Prison ship
 Prison Ship Martyrs' Monument
 Transport Board

Citations

References
 
 "The Ship of the Line - Volume 1: The development of the battlefleet 1650–1850", by Brian Lavery (Conway Maritime Press, 2003). .
 "The Floating Prison: The Remarkable Account of Nine Years' Captivity on the British Prison Hulks During the Napoleonic Wars", by Louis Garneray & Richard Rose (Conway Maritime Press, 2003). .
 "The Intolerable Hulks: British Shipboard Confinement (1776–1857)", by Charles F. Campbell (Fenestar Books, Tucson, AZ, 2001).
 "The Convicts of the Eleanor", by David Kent and Norma Townsend (Merlin Press, London, 2002).
 "A Commonwealth of Thieves", by Thomas Keneally (Random House, Milson Point NSW, Australia, 2005).

External links
 Martyrdom of thirteen thousand American Patriots aboard the monstrous Jersey and other British prison ships in New York Harbor
 Britain's Prison Ships, 1776–1783
 Ships of the Old Navy: A history of the sailing ships of the Royal Navy by Michael Phillips
 List of Training ships: Reformatories and Industrial Schools.

Convict ships
Prison ships
Ships built in England
Ships of the line of the Royal Navy
Ships of the Royal Navy
Ships of England